Alejandro Diz (born March 26, 1965) is a former volleyball player from Argentina, who represented his native country in two Summer Olympics. After having finished in sixth place at the 1984 Summer Olympics in Los Angeles, California he was a member of the men's national team four years later in Seoul, South Korea, claiming the bronze medal.

References
 

1965 births
Argentine men's volleyball players
Living people
Olympic volleyball players of Argentina
Volleyball players at the 1984 Summer Olympics
Volleyball players at the 1988 Summer Olympics
Olympic bronze medalists for Argentina
Place of birth missing (living people)
Olympic medalists in volleyball
Medalists at the 1988 Summer Olympics
Pan American Games medalists in volleyball
Pan American Games bronze medalists for Argentina
Medalists at the 1983 Pan American Games